Lega Alto Adige–Südtirol, whose official name is , is a regionalist political party active in South Tyrol. The party was a "national" section of Lega Nord (LN) from 1991 to 2000 and has been the regional section of Lega per Salvini Premier (LSP) in South Tyrol since 2020.

Like Team K and the Greens, the LNST is an inter-ethnic party.

History

Foundation and early years
The party was founded in Bolzano in 1992, obtaining 3.6% in that year's general election. Its first and founding national secretary was Umberto Montefiori, who was elected to the Provincial Council in the 1993 regional election, when the party obtained 3.0% of the vote. Montefiori, a retired official of the Carabinieri and close ally of Irene Pivetti, disagreed with Lega Nord's separatist turn after the 1996 general election and left the party, along with Pivetti, shortly after.

In 1997 the party, deprived of its most recognisable leader and only provincial councillor, was trying to join forces with "Alliance 98", formed by Christian Waldner after his ejection from Die Freiheitlichen (dF) in 1994, when Waldner was shot dead by Peter Paul Reiner, a former political ally who had remained a leading member of dF. The event brought down the only chance that LNST had at the time to flourish again. In the 1998 provincial election the party thus obtained a mere 0.9% of the vote. The result of 2003 was even worse: 0.5% of the vote. This was enough for Lega Nord's federal leadership to find ways in order to enlarge the party toward the 2008 provincial election.

Enlarging the party's tent
In the 2008 provincial election, the LNST fielded a heterogenous list with both Italian- and German-speaking candidates. In the run-up to the election the party was joined by Roland Atz, former Vice President of the Trentino-Alto Adige/Südtirol Region and leading member of the South Tyrolean People's Party (SVP), Elena Artioli, another SVP splinter and one of the few multilingual members of that party before it restricted its membership to German- and Ladin-speakers, and Paolo Bassani, a centrist politician who had been previously member of the Italian Liberal Party, Forza Italia and finally the Italian Republican Party. This strategy, designed by Roberto Calderoli, prompted Kurt Pancheri to resign from national secretary. In the election the LNST won the 2.1% of the vote and Artioli was elected to the Provincial Council.

In January 2013 Artioli was elected national secretary of the party, ending five years of transitional leadership provided by the federal party. In May she announced that the party would run in the 2013 provincial election as part of the Team Autonomies/Team Artioli (Team A), a larger autonomist and inter-ethnic electoral list inspired to the Austrian Team Stronach. Later, in September, the Team A was integrated into the "Forza Alto Adige–Lega Nord–Team Autonomies" list, along with The People of Freedom. In the October election the list took 2.5% of the vote. Artioli was the only candidate elected. In January 2014, at the very beginning of the Council term, Artioli voted in favour of SVP's Arno Kompatscher in a vote of confidence, consequently left Lega Nord and joined the Democratic Party.

Recent history
In the run-up of the 2014 European Parliament election Lega Nord formed a pact with Die Freiheitlichen (dF), according to which the dF's symbol and candidates were included in the party's slates. In the 2015 municipal election in Bolzano, for mayor, the LNST supported Carlo Vettori, who had joined the party just two years before and styled himself as a strong supporter of the party's "inter-ethnic" identity, and gained 11.0% of the vote. In Laives LNST's Christian Bianchi was elected mayor with the support of the SVP and the Five Star Movement (M5S). The new course and, especially, Artioli's exit brought Pancheri back into the party's fold. Bolzano returned to vote in 2016: the LNST, that tried to forge an alliance with the SVP and finally supported a joint centre-right candidate, was reduced to 9.0%.

In the 2018 general election the party won 9.6%, as part of a general surge of the federal party.

In the 2018 provincial election the party won 11.1%, its best result ever in the province. After the election, it joined forces with the SVP as junior partner in the provincial government. Giuliano Vettorato and Massimo Bessone were appointed vice president and minister, respectively.

The party increased its tally to 17.5% in the 2019 European Parliament election.

Ideology
LNST presents itself as a party "inspired by the principles of Christianity", representing South Tyroleans, regardless their language or ethnicity, including multilingual people. In fact, according to its program, the main goals of the party is to enhance the collaboration and the interaction of the three language groups (Italian, German and Ladin) and to legally recognize the reality of multilingual people (i.e. citizens who identify with two linguistic identities). The party professes also a libertarian credo and one of its slogans is "less Province, more private", while emphasizing family, education and health-care issues.

Popular support
The party is a tiny one compared to other "national sections" of Lega Nord. Its results in the Province of Bolzano are shown in the tables below.

Leadership
Secretary: Umberto Montefiori (1991–1996), Rolando Fontan (commissioner 1996–2000), Kurt Pancheri (2000–2001), Sergio Divina (commissioner, 2001–2007), Maurizio Fugatti (commissioner, 2007-2010), Maurizio Bosatra (commissioner, 2010–2012), Matteo Bragantini (commissioner, 2012–2013), Elena Artioli (2013–2014), Maurizio Fugatti (commissioner, 2014–2017), Massimo Bessone (commissioner, 2017–2019), Maurizio Bosatra (commissioner, 2019–2020), Giuliano Vettorato (commissioner, 2020–present)
President: unknown (1991–1999) Sergio Tamajo (1999–2008), Andrea Gallo (2013–2014)

References

1991 establishments in Italy
Federalist parties in Italy
Lega Nord
Political parties established in 1991
Political parties in South Tyrol